The Ambewela Aitken Spence Wind Farm is small wind farm in Ambewela, owned and operated by Ace Wind Power, a subsidiary of Aitken Spence. As of October 2012, it is one of the only few operating multi-megawatt wind farms in Sri Lanka.

See also 

 Electricity in Sri Lanka
 List of power stations in Sri Lanka

References 

Wind farms in Sri Lanka
Buildings and structures in Nuwara Eliya District